Kim Min-su (born January 24, 1977), better known by his stage name Don Spike is a South Korean singer, composer and entertainer.

Personal life

Relationships 
In May 2022, it was reported that Don Spike would hold a wedding with his non-celebrity girlfriend on June 4, 2022.

Drug use allegations 
On September 27, 2022, Don Spike was arrested due to test resulted in a positive test for narcotics of using methamphetamine. According to news reports, the Nowon Police Station in Seoul had arrested Don Spike at around 8 pm on the 26th at a hotel in Gangnam, Seoul.

Discography

Singles

As producer

Filmography

Television

Web shows

References

External links
 

1977 births
Living people
South Korean pop singers
21st-century South Korean male  singers